Mayankodu Kelath Narayanan (born 10 March 1934) is a former Indian Police Service officer. He was National Security Adviser of India from 2005 to 2010, assuming the role after the demise of his predecessor Jyotindra Nath Dixit in January 2005. Subsequently, he served as 19th Governor of West Bengal from 2010 to 2014. The Government of India awarded him the civilian honour of Padma Shri in 1992.

Early life
M K Narayanan hails from Kelath family at Ottapalam, Palakkad, a district of the state Kerala.

Narayanan did schooling from Madras Christian College Higher Secondary School. He completed his graduation from Loyola College, Chennai. He is married to Padmini Narayanan and the couple has a son, Vijay, and a daughter, Meena. Their son-in-law Ajit Nambiar is Chairman and Managing Director of BPL Ltd.

Career
M. K. Narayanan joined the Indian Police Service in 1955 and passed out with the highest marks. After a brief stint as Sub-Divisional Police Officer in the erstwhile State of Madras, he went on deputation to the Intelligence Bureau in February 1959. The rest of his service career was spent under the Government of India, mainly in the Intelligence Bureau, in which he dealt with a whole range of issues concerning internal and national security.

He headed the Intelligence Bureau (IB) from 1987 to 1990, before heading the Joint Intelligence Committee for a year. He became Chief (a four-star rank, equivalent to an Army general) of the IB again in 1991, before retiring in 1992. He was then appointed Special Adviser (a non-Civil Service appointment) for Internal Security to the Prime Minister of India beginning in May 2004.
He was Indian National Security Adviser with the rank of Minister of State from 2005 to 2010. He played a significant role in the negotiation of the Indo-US Civil Nuclear Agreement. He took over as Governor of West Bengal from Gopalkrishna Gandhi, who had a few disagreements with the then CPI(M)-ruled state on critical issues like violence in Nandigram and Singur.

See also

 Brajesh Mishra
 National Security Council

References

External links
 M. K. Narayanan by B. Raman
 https://web.archive.org/web/20130816020917/http://www.bprd.nic.in/writereaddata/mainlinkFile/File1052.pdf

1934 births
Living people
Malayali people
Governors of West Bengal
Directors of Intelligence Bureau (India)
University of Madras alumni
Recipients of the Padma Shri in civil service
People from Ottapalam
Indian Police Service officers